Yevgeni Nikolayevich Nazarov (born 7 April 1997) is a Russian football player.

Club career
He made his debut in the Russian Professional Football League for FC Krasnodar-2 on 29 July 2016 in a game against FC Sochi. In the 2016–17 season, he was called up to the main squad of FC Krasnodar for two Russian Cup games, but remained on the bench. He made his Russian Football National League debut for Krasnodar-2 on 8 August 2018 in a game against FC Tambov.

On 14 June 2019, he joined Czech club FK Teplice on loan.

On 25 January 2022, he signed a one-year contract with Bohemians 1905 in the Czech Republic.

On 23 July 2022, FC Urartu announced the signing of Nazarov. Nazarov left Urartu less than two months later, on 1 September 2022 having played twice for the club.

References

External links
 
 
 Profile by Russian Professional Football League

1997 births
People from Stavropol Krai
Sportspeople from Stavropol Krai
Living people
Russian footballers
Association football defenders
Russia under-21 international footballers
FC Krasnodar-2 players
FC Krasnodar players
FK Teplice players
FC SKA-Khabarovsk players
Bohemians 1905 players
Russian Second League players
Russian First League players
Czech First League players
Russian expatriate footballers
Expatriate footballers in the Czech Republic
Russian expatriate sportspeople in the Czech Republic